The Rose Tattoo is a 1955 American film adaptation of the Tennessee Williams play of the same name. It was adapted by Williams and Hal Kanter and directed by Daniel Mann, with stars Anna Magnani, Burt Lancaster, Marisa Pavan and Jo Van Fleet. Williams originally wrote the play for Italian Anna Magnani to play on Broadway in 1951, but she declined the offer because of her difficulty with the English language at the time. By the time of this film adaptation, she was ready.

Anna Magnani won the Academy Award for Best Actress for her performance, and the film won
Best Art Direction and Best Cinematography receiving five other nominations including Best Picture and Best Supporting Actress for Pavan.

Plot 
Serafina Delle Rose (Anna Magnani), a Sicilian seamstress, living in a community in proximity to the Gulf of Mexico, fiercely proud of and loyal to her truck-driving husband Rosario, is pregnant with her second child. While he is sleeping, Estelle (Virginia Grey) asks Serafina to make a shirt for her lover from some expensive silk material; Serafina does not know that the lover is Rosario, and that earlier that afternoon, Estelle got a tattoo of a rose on her chest to match Rosario's.

That night, Rosario is killed in an accident while trying to evade police during a smuggling run. When Serafina discovers her beloved husband's demise she collapses, and later the local doctor informs her daughter Rosa (Marisa Pavan) and the women of the neighborhood that Serafina has miscarried.

Three years later, Serafina has become a recluse, allowing her appearance and reputation to deteriorate, to Rosa's embarrassment. Serafina decides to attend her daughter's graduation, but two women arrive demanding Serafina quickly mend their bandanas for a festival. Serafina reluctantly does so, but is appalled by their talk of men and reprimands them. One of the women, Bessie (Jo Van Fleet), takes offense and mocks Serafina with Rosario's infidelity. Serafina sits alone in the dark until Rosa comes home, and is infuriated when Rosa introduces her to her new sailor boyfriend Jack Hunter (Ben Cooper). After her interrogation, he confides that he is a virgin.  She forces him to vow before a statue of the Virgin Mary that he will respect Rosa's innocence.

Determined to find out the truth about her husband, Serafina heads to the church (where a bazaar is being held) to ask the priest if her husband had confessed to an affair with another woman. When he refuses to answer, she attacks him, and a truck driver named Alvaro (Burt Lancaster) pulls her off. Alvaro drives the dazed Serafina home in his banana truck, where she offers to repair his torn shirt. Serafina loans Alvaro the rose silk shirt that she had sewn the night of her husband's death until she is able to repair it, and they agree to meet later that night.

Alvaro returns, having impulsively gotten a rose tattooed on his chest. Serafina is disgusted and tries to throw him out, then demands that Alvaro drive her to a club her husband used to attend. Once there, she meets Estelle, who confesses and shows Serafina the rose tattooed on her chest as a symbol of her love for Rosario. Returning home, Serafina smashes the urn containing Rosario's ashes, and invites Alvaro to return in the night.

Alvaro turns up hours later severely intoxicated and, mortified by his actions, Serafina leaves him in a drunken stupor and retires to bed. That night Rosa returns home and falls asleep on the sofa; Alvaro awakens and, still drunk, mistakes Rosa for Serafina and tries to kiss her; Rosa wakes up and screams, and Serafina gets rid of him.

The following morning Serafina finds him on top of a boat mast outside her house begging for her forgiveness. Serafina and Rosa are extremely embarrassed and Serafina refuses to leave the house in order to make him come down, much to Rosa's frustration. At that moment Jack arrives and asks Serafina if he can marry Rosa. Serafina is stunned, but seeing that this is what Rosa wants she gives them her consent and they leave to be married. Serafina then calls Alvaro down from the boat mast before declaring in front of her neighbors that they have to pick up from where they left off the night before. They enter her house and shut the door. A lively pop tune is heard starting up on Serafina's player piano, along with the sounds of their partying and laughter.

Cast 
 Anna Magnani – Serafina Delle Rose
 Burt Lancaster – Alvaro Mangiacavallo
 Marisa Pavan – Rosa Delle Rose
 Ben Cooper – Seaman Jack Hunter
 Virginia Grey – Estelle Hohengarten
 Jo Van Fleet – Bessie
 Sandro Giglio – Father De Leo
 Mimi Aguglia – Assunta
 Florence Sundstrom – Flora
 Jeanne Hart - Violetta

Production and release
Much of the film was shot on location in Key West, Florida, although the setting is not specifically mentioned in the film.  The house featured in the film stands to this day and is known, appropriately, as the "Rose Tattoo House".

The premiere of the film was held in New York City at the Hotel Astor on December 12, 1955, with Arthur Miller, Marlon Brando, Marilyn Monroe and Jayne Mansfield among the celebrities in attendance.

Awards and nominations

References

External links 
 
 
 

1955 films
1955 comedy-drama films
American comedy-drama films
American black-and-white films
American films based on plays
Films set in New Orleans
Films featuring a Best Actress Academy Award-winning performance
Films featuring a Best Drama Actress Golden Globe-winning performance
Films featuring a Best Supporting Actress Golden Globe-winning performance
Films whose art director won the Best Art Direction Academy Award
Films whose cinematographer won the Best Cinematography Academy Award
Paramount Pictures films
Films directed by Daniel Mann
Films produced by Hal B. Wallis
Films with screenplays by Tennessee Williams
Films scored by Alex North
Films based on works by Tennessee Williams
1950s English-language films
1950s American films